Betting Bangarraju is a 2010 Indian Telugu-language romantic comedy film produced by Ramoji Rao  under Ushakiran Movies starring Allari Naresh and Nidhi Oza in the lead roles.

The film revolves around Naresh and his plans to make his love successful. Bangaraju bets on almost everything, it shows how he wins his love by eliminating possible suitors. It is based on the nuances of a chronic better, the hero.

Plot
Bangarraju is a carefree youth and a very lucky guy who is referred to as an idiot in his village, and who bets on almost everything and wins in the bet, whereas his father is a respectable person. One day, his friend visits him telling him that he loved and married a city girl but this was not the actual story. Raju, inspired by this, goes to the city and loves a girl. But the girl already has three other suitors. She invites all of them to her house and family for they are going to choose her suitor. The rest of the story is about how Raju eliminates the other suitors by betting with them cleverly and winning the girl.

Cast
 Allari Naresh as Betting Bangarraju
 Nidhi Oza as Divya
 Kota Srinivasa Rao
 Krishna Bhagavaan
 Surekha Vani
 Shankar Melkote
 L. B. Sriram
 Amit Tiwari
 Hema
 Nalla Venu
 Shanoor Sana
 Jyothi

Soundtrack

Release
It was one of the top 10 movies in Telugu cinema in the year 2010. It has collected 10 crores gross. The movie received much critical appreciation for Allari Naresh for his performance.

References

2010 films
2010s Telugu-language films
Films directed by E. Satti Babu